Matola is a city in southern Mozambique.

Matola may also refer to

People
 James Matola (born 1977), Zimbabwean football (soccer) defender
 Sharon Matola (1954–2021), American-born Belizean biologist, conservationist, and zookeeper
 Nando (Mozambican footballer), born Fernando Paulo Matola (1982-2007),  Mozambican football (soccer) player

Places
 Matola, a locality in Elche, Spain
Matola, Tanzania, a town ward in Tanzania
Matola River, a watercourse located in the Maputo Province of Mozambique